, born November 20, 1965 and known by his shikona  is a Japanese retired sumo wrestler from the city of Kaizuka in Osaka Prefecture.  His sumo stable was Mihogaseki.
His height is 188 cm (6 ft 2 in) and his peak weight was 229 kg (505 lbs). His highest rank was jūryō 9.

Career record
Career results: 235 wins, 216 losses, 14 bouts missed due to injury (64 tournaments).

Other points to note
His peak weight of 229 kilograms (505 lbs) means he ranks tenth in the list of heaviest sumo wrestlers.

See also
Glossary of sumo terms
List of past sumo wrestlers

References
 Nihon Sumo Kyokai

External links
 sumodb

1965 births
Living people
Japanese sumo wrestlers
Sumo people from Osaka Prefecture
People from Kaizuka, Osaka